The 2nd Battalion, 7th Marines (2/7) is a light infantry battalion of the United States Marine Corps. They are based at the Marine Corps Air Ground Combat Center Twentynine Palms and consist of approximately 800 Marines and Sailors. The battalion falls under the command of the 7th Marine Regiment and the 1st Marine Division.

Subordinate units
The battalion's current subordinate units are:
 Headquarters & Service Company
 Easy Company
 Fox Company
 Gunfighters Company
 Weapons Company

At the beginning of World War II, the battalion had three subordinate rifle companies – E (Easy), F (Fox), G (Gunfighters), a weapons company designated as H (How), and a Headquarters Company.  As the war progressed, the weapons company was eliminated and the component elements redistributed throughout the headquarters and rifle companies.
  
During the Korean War, the battalion's three rifle companies were designated D (Dog), E (Easy) and F (Fox).  
During the Vietnam War, the battalion was organized under a four rifle company order of battle – E (Echo), F (Fox), G (Golf) and H (Hotel).
As of 2022, 2nd Battalion, 7th Marines utilizes the company callsigns of E (Easy), F (Fox), G (Gunfighters), and Weapons (Wildcard) for their subordinate companies.

History

World War II

Guadalcanal
The battalion was activated on 1 January 1941 at Guantanamo Bay, Cuba.  On 18 September 1942, 2/7 landed on Guadalcanal.  They fought the Battle of Guadalcanal for four months until they were relieved by elements of the United States Army's Americal Division. The battalion was then sent to Australia along with the rest of the 1st Marine Division for rest and refit.

Operation Cartwheel
2/7 landed on Cape Gloucester, New Britain on 26 December 1943 under the command of Lieutenant colonel Odell M. Conoley securing an airfield the first day. That night, Japanese Marines counterattacked and 2/7 took the brunt of the assault and the fighting continued throughout the night. By the time the sun began to rise, the entire Japanese force had been wiped out.  On 14 January, 2/7 along with the rest of the regiment assaulted and took the last Japanese stronghold on the island, Hill 660. Two days later, the counter-attack came but the Marines held the hilltop often resorting to hand-to-hand fighting.

The battalion continued to run patrols around the island to protect against guerrilla attacks from hold-out Japanese soldiers. In March 1944, New Britain was declared secure and on 1 April 1st Marine Division was relieved by the US Army 40th Infantry Division.  2/7, and the rest of the 1st Marine Division again returned to Australia.

Battle of Peleliu
On 15 September 1943
, the 7th Marines (minus the 2nd battalion) landed along with the rest of the 1st Marine Division. Note: The 2nd battalion was the only battalion to be held in reserve. They were to go in later in the day in support of the 7th Marines. However, Chesty Puller's 1st Marines were having the worst time as they were on the left flank and adjacent to where the mountainous area on Peleliu called the Umurbrogal Pocket began – where all the Japanese holed up. On the night of 20 September the 2nd battalion went out to the transfer line, but there were not enough LVT's. Instead, they had to wait and go in the next morning directly in support of Chesty Puller's 1st Marines. The 2nd battalion went right into the middle of the fighting of the 1st marine regiment. When they landed they were met by intense artillery and mortar fire from Japanese positions that had not been touched by the pre-invasion bombardment.  On 20 September, the 7th Marines broke out of their beachhead and linked up with the 1st Marines.  The battalion fought on the island for another eight weeks before it was secured.

Battle of Okinawa
On 1 April 1945, was part of the 80,000 Marines that landed on Okinawa. The 1st Marine Division landed on the southern portion of Okinawa against light resistance. Their beachhead was quickly secured and supplies began flowing in. Resistance began to become stronger as the Marines pushed north. The 1st Marine Division was ordered into Reserve to protect the right flank of the invasion forces. The battalion fought the Japanese along the coast and was stopped suddenly at the Shuri Castle. For 30 days, along with the rest of the Division and the Army 77th Infantry Division, battled the Japanese stronghold.

After Okinawa, 2/7 was part of the Operation Beleaguer in China where they went to repatriate the Japanese forces there. In addition they were called upon to keep the peace during the bloody civil war between the Chinese Nationalists and Communist forces. In 1947, 2/7 returned to California and were deactivated later that year.

Korean War

The Battalion participated in the Inchon Landing and the recapture of Seoul. The 1st Marine Division, was then put back on ship and sailed around to the east coast of Korea. They eventually landed at Wonsan in late October and from there participated in the Battle of Chosin Reservoir.

During the battle Captain William Barber earned the Medal of Honor for his actions as commander of Fox 2/7.  F/2/7 held a position known as "Fox Hill" against vastly superior numbers of Chinese infantry, holding the Toktong Pass open and keeping the 5th Marine Regiment and the 7th Marine Regiment from getting cut off at Yudam-ni.  His company's actions to keep the pass open, allowed these two regiments to perform their withdrawal from Yudam-ni and consolidate with the rest of the 1st Marine Division at Hagaru-ri.

The mission to relieve F/2/7 on top of Fox Hill also led to LtCol Raymond Davis, then commanding officer of 1st Battalion 7th Marines, receiving the Medal of Honor. After the withdrawal from Chosin the 1st Marine Division was evacuated from Hungnam. The battalion took part in fighting on the East Central Front and Western Front of the Jamestown Line for the remainder of the war. 

Hospital Corpsman 3rd Class William R. Charette, USN was assigned as a medical corpsman with Company F, 2nd Battalion, 7th Marines on 27 March 1953, when his heroic actions earned him the Medal of Honor.

Vietnam War
2/7 was deployed to Vietnam from July 1965 until October 1970 as part of the 7th Marine Regiment, 1st Marine Division.  The Battalion operated in the southern half of I Corp most of the time. Qui Nhon, Chu Lai, Da Nang Air Base, Dai Loc and An Hoa. 2/7 were instrumental players in Operation Utah and Operation Harvest Moon.

The Gulf War and the 1990s
2/7 relocated during January 1990 to Marine Corps Air Ground Combat Center Twentynine Palms, California, and participated in Operations Desert Shield and Desert Storm in Saudi Arabia and Kuwait from August 1990 through March 1991 when they redeployed back to the United States. For the rest of the 1990s the battalion took part in the regular Unit Deployment Program (UDP) rotation to Okinawa. In this scheme, 7th Marine Regiment sequentially rotated one of its battalions to Camp Schwab for six months to serve as one of the three battalions attached to the 4th Marine Regiment.

Iraq 2003-2007
During the 2003 invasion of Iraq, 2/7 was stop-moved in Okinawa until the Summer of 2003.  The battalion deployed in February 2004 in support of Operation Iraqi Freedom (OIF).  They were among the first Marines redeployed to the country after the initial invasion, and lost eight Marines during that deployment. The battalion deployed in support of OIF for the second time from July 2005 to January 2006.  They operated in the Al-Anbar Province and suffered 13 Marines killed in action. The battalion was again deployed to Al-Anbar from January to August 2007. During this third Iraq deployment, 2/7 suffered 8 Marines killed in action. Marines from the battalion took part in Operation Vigilant Resolve< and Operation Alljah.

Afghanistan 2008, 2012-2013
 

2/7 deployed to Helmand and Farah Provinces, Afghanistan from April to December 2008.
The battalion spearheaded the return of Marines to Afghanistan, and was engaged in heavy combat with insurgent elements throughout their deployment.
2/7 operated from Camp Bastion and bases in Sangin, Gereshk, Musa Qaleh, Now Zad, Delaram, Gulistan, Bakwa and Bala Baluk.  Called "the hardest hit battalion in the Corps this year ," in 2008,
the battalion suffered 20 men killed and 160 wounded, thirty of which were amputees. Four Marines assigned or attached to the battalion were awarded the Navy Cross for their actions during the 2008 deployment.  The battalion deployed to Afghanistan again in the autumn of 2012 into early 2013.

Okinawa, Unit Deployment Program, and the 31st MEU, 2009-2011
Following its Afghanistan deployment, 2/7 deployed to Okinawa, Japan in January 2010, for the first time since 2002.  The Battalion was the ground combat element for the 31st Marine Expeditionary Unit from December 2009 – June 2010, and then again from June–December 2011.

Special Purpose Marine Air-Ground Task Force, Central-Command
As of June 2019, the battalion has deployed with the SP-MAGTF as the Ground Combat Element three separate times since late-2014. As the GCE, the unit has deployed to Iraq, Yemen, Jordan, Syria, Afghanistan, & Kuwait. Missions have included training with foreign partners, providing base security, isolated-personnel recovery, & crisis response.

Unit awards
A unit citation or commendation is an award bestowed upon an organization for the action cited.  Members of the unit who participated in said actions are allowed to wear on their uniforms the appropriate ribbon of the awarded unit citation.  2nd Battalion, 7th Marines have been awarded the following:

Medal of Honor

Ten Marines and two Sailors have been awarded the Medal of Honor while serving with 2d Battalion, 7th Marines.

Battle of Guadalcanal
Sgt Mitchell Paige – 26 October 1942

Battle of Peleliu
PFC Charles H. Roan – 18 September 1944 (posthumously)
PFC John D. New – 25 September 1944 (posthumously)

Korean War
Cpl Lee H. Phillips – 4 November 1950 (posthumously)	
SSgt Robert S. Kennemore – 27–28 November 1950
PFC Hector A. Cafferata Jr. – 28 November 1950 	
Capt William E. Barber – 28 November-2 December 1950
Sgt Daniel P. Matthews – 28 March 1953 (posthumously)
Hospitalman Richard De Wert USN – 5 April 1951 (posthumously)
Hospital Corpsman 3rd Class William R. Charette, USN – 27 March 1953
SSgt Ambrosio Guillen – 25 July 1953 (posthumously)

Vietnam War
PFC Oscar P. Austin – 23 February 1969 (posthumously)

Other notable former personnel
Henry H. Black – 2nd Battalion 7th Marines Sergeant Major, who also served as the 7th Sergeant Major of the Marine Corps from 1975 to 1977.
James Brady – served with 2/7 during the Korean War, including platoon commander and executive officer with D Company and battalion intelligence officer.
Ronald D. Castille – served with 2/7 during the Vietnam War.
John Chafee – served with 2/7 during the Korean War.
Herman H. Hanneken, Medal of Honor, Battalion Commander on Guadalcanal.
Angel Mendez – Navy Cross, Vietnam War.
Anthony Swofford – served with 2/7 during the Gulf War.
Roy Tackett – served with 2/7 during World War II.
John A. Toolan – Golf Company, 2/7 company commander 1982–1984
Paul K. Van Riper, Battalion Commander 1983–1985
John H. Yancey – served with E Company in the Battle of Chosin Reservoir, earning a Navy Cross and Silver Star.

In popular culture
 One of the subplots in Season 1 Episode 10 of the television series The West Wing, In Excelsis Deo, centers around Toby Ziegler getting involved in the fate of a dead homeless person who Zeigler identifies to the police as a former Marine and Korean War veteran by a 2/7 tattoo on the dead man's arm.
2/7 is highlighted in a 2008 deployment to Afghanistan in the book '15 Years of War' where the Marines fought one of the most arduous battles the Marine Corps has seen in Now Zad, Afghanistan.
A documentary titled The Forgotten Battalion about 2/7 and their unique suicide problem was released in 2020.

See also
Al Anbar campaign
List of United States Marine Corps battalions
Organization of the United States Marine Corps

Notes

References

Bibliography

Web

External link

Infantry battalions of the United States Marine Corps
1st Marine Division (United States)